The Șușița is a right tributary of the river Siret in Romania. It discharges into the Siret in Doaga. It flows through the following towns and villages, from source to mouth: Rucăreni, Dragosloveni, Rotileștii Mari, Câmpuri, Gogoiu, Răcoasa, Varnița, Repedea, Panciu, Satu Nou, Tișița and Doaga.

Tributaries
The following rivers are tributaries to the river Șușița (from source to mouth):

Left: Dragomira, Soveja, Chiua, Dumicuș, Cremeneț, Alba, Verdea, Repejoara (or Pârâul Repede), Punga, Aluna, Ernatica, Gâsca (or Pârâul lui Gâscă), Pârâul lui Pricop, Repedea (or Valea Rea), Valea Îngustă, Volădanu, Hăulița
Right: Păcura, Furtuneasca, Rotilași, Sărățelu, Pârâul Sărat, Pârâul Găii, Flâmânda, Podobitu, Giurgea, Pârâul lui Găman, Vizontea, Mireanu, Glăznescu, Ciubotaru, Chinu, Pârâul Văii, Varnița

References

Rivers of Romania
Rivers of Vrancea County